Sean McDonough (born May 13, 1962) is an American sportscaster, currently employed by ESPN and WEEI Red Sox Radio Network.

Early life 
The son of Boston Globe sportswriter Will McDonough, McDonough graduated from the S. I. Newhouse School of Public Communications of Syracuse University in 1984 with a degree in broadcast journalism. During college, he worked for Syracuse football coach Dick MacPherson.

Career

Early career
McDonough was an intern at the short-lived Enterprise Radio Network in 1981.

It was in Syracuse where McDonough began his broadcasting career in 1982 as the play-by-play announcer for the Syracuse Chiefs of the International League. McDonough was also an Ivy League football announcer for PBS. He was a sideline reporter from 1984 to 1985 and a play-by-play announcer from 1986 to 1987.

Boston Red Sox
Four years after graduating from Syracuse, he began broadcasting Boston Red Sox games on WSBK-TV (Channel 38) in Boston with former Red Sox catcher Bob Montgomery and later former Red Sox second baseman Jerry Remy.

McDonough continued announcing broadcast Red Sox games through the 2004 season, moving over the years to various local stations, including WFXT (Channel 25), WABU (Channel 68), and WLVI (Channel 56). In 1996, he was teamed with Jerry Remy. He worked with Remy for nine seasons, ultimately only Friday night games, before being replaced in 2005 by NESN announcer Don Orsillo. McDonough attributed his firing to his salary and disputed talk that his "candor" was to blame.

He turned down an offer to become the New York Mets play-by-play man on television in 2005 before the Red Sox notified him that they would not pick up his option for 2005.

In 2019, McDonough returned to Red Sox broadcasts as a part-time play-by-play announcer on the team's radio network, announcing 30-32 games that season and becoming a permanent part-time announcer alongside Joe Castiglione, Will Flemming, and Lou Merloni in 2020.

CBS Sports
He began work for CBS Sports in 1990, where he broadcast college basketball (including 10 NCAA tournaments), college football (including the prestigious Orange Bowl game), the College World Series, the NFL, US Open tennis, three Winter Olympics (bobsled and luge in 1992 and 1994 and ice hockey in 1998), and golf (including four Masters and PGA Championships).

In December 1999, CBS Sports President Sean McManus informed McDonough that his contract would not be renewed. Once Dick Enberg, late of NBC was available, McDonough became the odd man out.

Major League Baseball on CBS
Outside of New England, he is probably best remembered for his time as CBS's lead baseball announcer, a role in which he was teamed with Tim McCarver. In 1992 at the age of 30, he became the youngest man to announce the national broadcast (and all nine innings of all of the games played) of the World Series. Coincidentally, that particular record would be broken four years later by Fox's 27-year-old Joe Buck, the son of the man McDonough replaced on CBS, Jack Buck.

Perhaps McDonough's most famous call is his emotional description of the Atlanta Braves' Francisco Cabrera (who had only 10 at-bats at the major league level that season) getting a dramatic, game-winning base hit in Game 7 of the 1992 National League Championship Series against the Pittsburgh Pirates:

He also called the final play of the subsequent 1992 World Series, in which the Toronto Blue Jays became the first non-American based team to win the Major League Baseball's world championship: 

A year later, McDonough called Joe Carter's dramatic 1993 World Series ending home run off Mitch Williams of the Philadelphia Phillies: 

Three years later, while calling the College World Series for CBS alongside Steve Garvey, McDonough called another series-clinching home run. This time, it was Warren Morris, who hit a two out, 9th inning walk-off home run that won the 1996 College World Series for the Louisiana State University Fighting Tigers against Miami.

NCAA Basketball on CBS
McDonough's other major endeavor at CBS was his coverage of the NCAA tournament with then-partner (and fellow Irish-American) Bill Raftery. McDonough and Raftery covered a number of regional finals in the 1990s before McDonough's run at CBS came to an end. The pair developed a terrific on-air rapport, thereby enabling them to spice up their broadcasts. Before the 1999 South Regional Final between Ohio State and St. John's from Knoxville, Tennessee, McDonough and Raftery donned fishing gear as they previewed the game from a boat on the Tennessee River, which was just outside the arena.

In 1998, McDonough—with Raftery at his side—called one of the great buzzer-beaters in NCAA Tournament history, as Connecticut defeated Washington in the East Regional semifinals on a last-second shot by Richard Hamilton.

ABC/ESPN
Since 2000, McDonough has announced baseball, college basketball, college football, golf, NBA, NHL, and NCAA hockey for ESPN/ABC. Specifically, McDonough announced many Big East college football and basketball events. He has also contributed to ESPN's coverage of the U.S. Open and British Open golf tournaments, and called the 2010 NCAA Division I Men's Lacrosse Championship Final Four alongside Quint Kessenich.

McDonough called NCAA basketball play-by-play on March 12, 2009 on ESPN between UConn and Syracuse which went into 6 overtimes, becoming the longest game in Big East history, clocking 3 hours and 46 minutes. The final score was 127–117 in favor of Syracuse. Also on the broadcast was color commentary from Bill Raftery and Jay Bilas.

On September 28, 2011, McDonough called the nationally televised game in which the Baltimore Orioles came back to defeat the Boston Red Sox 4-3 after Boston closer Jonathan Papelbon came within one strike of closing the game. McDonough called Baltimore's Robert Andino's walk-off single, which occurred only three minutes before Evan Longoria's walk-off home run against the New York Yankees in St. Petersburg gave the Tampa Bay Rays, who trailed the Red Sox by nine games on September 3, the American League Wild Card, as follows:

College football, the NFL, and the NHL
McDonough was also behind the mic for the fumbled punt in the final seconds of the Michigan State-Michigan football game on October 17, 2015, that resulted in the game-winning touchdown for the Spartans. 

Starting in 2013, McDonough started play-by-play work for the NFL on ESPN Radio. Others included Ryan Ruocco, Marc Kestecher, and Bill Rosinski, who previously did NFL games for NFL on Westwood One as the Atlanta Falcons and the Carolina Panthers.

McDonough was named the lead play-by-play announcer for Monday Night Football (succeeding Mike Tirico, who departed for NBC Sports) beginning in the 2016 season. In March 2018, ESPN announced that McDonough would be leaving Monday Night Football and would return to announcing college football games.

On June 29, 2021, ESPN formally confirmed that he would be its lead play-by-play voice for their forthcoming NHL coverage beginning in the 2021–22 season, when the league returned to ESPN and ABC, after 16 years at NBC. He was reportedly interested in an NHL role ever since ESPN reacquired the rights to the NHL in March, and ESPN reportedly considered him and Steve Levy for the #1 play-by-play announcer role before eventually choosing him.

Health 
In 2012, McDonough had surgery for superior canal dehiscence syndrome which kept him from working for several months.

Honors 
In 2014, McDonough was named to the WAER Hall of Fame along with Bill Roth, Syracuse University's noncommercial radio station, where he began his sports broadcasting career as a student. S. I. Newhouse School of Public Communications also honored McDonough in July 2016 with the 4th annual Marty Glickman Award. In May 2007, he received an honorary Doctor of Humane Letters from Southern Vermont College.

Career timeline 
1982–1984: Syracuse Chiefs Radio Play-by-Play
1988–2004: Boston Red Sox TV Play-by-Play
1990–1999: College Basketball on CBS Play-by-Play
1991–1993: NFL on CBS Play-by-Play
1992–1993: MLB on CBS Lead Play-by-Play
1993–1994, 1999–2000, 2002–2004: NHL on ESPN Play-by-Play
1996–1999: College Football on CBS Lead Play-by-Play
1996–1999: Masters Tournament Hole Announcer
1995–1999: College World Series Play-by-Play
1992–1994: Bobsled and Luge in Winter Olympics Play-by-Play
1998: Ice Hockey 1998 Winter Olympics Play-by-Play
2000–present: College Basketball on ESPN Play-by-Play
2000–2003, 2009–2015, 2018–present: College Football on ABC Play-by-Play
2004–2015, 2018–present: College Football on ESPN Play-by-Play
2010–2014: U.S. Open Hole Announcer
2010–2015: British Open Hole Announcer
2010–2011: NCAA Men's Lacrosse Championship Play-by-Play
2011–2012: ESPN Monday Night Baseball Play-by-Play
2013–2015: NFL on ESPN Radio Play-by-Play
2016–2017: MNF on ESPN Play-by-Play
 2019–present: Boston Red Sox Radio Play-by-Play
2021–present: NHL on ESPN/NHL on ABC Lead Play-by-play

References

External links
The Sean McDonough Charitable Foundation, Inc.
Bowl Championship Series - McDonough, Sean
Odd man out of broadcast booth
Chat wrap: From the gridiron to the diamond
McDonough still being heard from - Boston Globe

1962 births
Living people
American radio sports announcers
American television sports announcers
Television anchors from Boston
Boston Bruins announcers
Boston Celtics announcers
Boston Red Sox announcers
College basketball announcers in the United States
College football announcers
College hockey announcers in the United States
Golf writers and broadcasters
Lacrosse announcers
Major League Baseball broadcasters
Minor League Baseball broadcasters
National Football League announcers
National Hockey League broadcasters
New England Patriots announcers
Olympic Games broadcasters
People from Hingham, Massachusetts
Sportspeople from Boston
S.I. Newhouse School of Public Communications alumni
Tennis commentators
Women's college basketball announcers in the United States